The Defense Language Office was an office within the United States Department of Defense. It was officially established in May 2005 under the Office of the Under Secretary of Defense for Personnel and Readiness to ensure a strategic focus on language and regional expertise among Defense Department military and civilian workers.” It was created by the Fiscal Year 2005 National Defense Authorization Act, which accompanied the House Report 108-491, "to provide oversight and execution of the Defense Language Transformation Roadmap."

According to the report, the Defense Language Office was set to "ensure a strategic focus on meeting present and future requirements for language and regional expertise among military personnel and civilian employees of the Department. This office should establish and oversee policy regarding the development, management, and utilization of civilian employees as well as members of the armed forces; monitor the promotion, accession and retention of individuals with these critical skills; explore innovative concepts to expand capabilities; and establish policies to identify, track, and maximize the use to meet requirements for language and regional expertise."

On February 6, 2012, the Defense Language Office and National Security Education Program were merged to form the Defense Language and National Security Education Office (DLNSEO), which consolidates cultural, linguistic, and regional foreign studies education efforts into a single program capable of satisfying national and Department-wide requirements.

References

See also
Defense Language Institute
National Security Education Program

United States Department of Defense agencies